DJMax Ray is a music mobile game developed by Pentavision Studio and published by Neowiz Internet in South Korea, and is an adaptation of the earlier DJMax titles Tap Sonic and DJMax Portable.

Development
The development of DJMax Ray was announced by This is Game during August 2012. The announcement explained that Neowiz Mobile and Pentavision had developed a mobile application codenamed DJMax Mobile 2012 and it would be published to the two leading mobile operating systems, Apple iOS and Android. The first teaser of this game was released on the official Tap Sonic YouTube account. The teaser explained that the game would be released on Apple iOS devices and would include a new song from NieN and ND Lee. On September 3, 2012, Neowiz Internet explained that the game would only be released on iOS devices and would not be released for Android.

On September 24, 2012, Neowiz Mobile released the DJMax Mobile 2012 gameplay movie and revealed the final title to be DJMax Ray.

On March 4, 2013, Neowiz Mobile released the DJMax Ray for Android with music packs from the iOS version and added a new exclusive music pack. The game went global on March 11, 2013. Some Android 2.3 devices can install it.

Gameplay
The gameplay is the same playing style as with Tap Sonic from Neowiz Internet but with new features. The gameplay features the same play style as Tap Sonic but has the key sound mixing system (where keys control specific sounds) and Fever mode as seen in other DJMax games such as the Portable series.

Players can select the style and the chart difficulty on the music settings screen. After that, the player taps spaces in the touch zone to complete the song. During the gameplay, players will gradually fill up the Fever bar with each successfully hit note. When the Fever bar fills up, players can activate fever mode to temporarily increase the rate at which the player gains points and combos. Fever is different from how it worked in DJMax Trilogy, instead being more similar to the DJMax Portable series. The Fever will activate for a short time, and players can fill the Fever bar during an existing Fever to activate fever mode again. In this way, the fever mode can incrementally increase to provide 8x the score and combos than without having Fever on. An option to have Fever activate automatically also exists. When the fever mode is over the score multiplier will disappear but the Fever bar can still be filled to start again.

Track Information 

DJMax Ray comes with 70 original DJMax songs, spread out across numerous song packs. The game comes with some free music and players can play four out of five included songs initially. The fifth song starts out locked, but the player can unlock the song by clearing the Challenge Mission in the pack.

The game includes a in-app store in which more music packs can be bought. Players can purchase a bundle pack to unlock all the music in the game.

New releases for Ray

Crossovers from previous DJMax games

Version 1.0.0 (Released on 28 September 2012)

Version 1.0.3 (Released on 13 November 2012)

Song Packs

Unlocked by default.

Unlocked with version 1.0.3

Unlocked with in-app purchasing. Price $1.99 (US iTunes App Store)

Unlocked with in-app purchasing. Price $1.99 (US iTunes App Store)

Unlocked with in-app purchasing. Price $1.99 (US iTunes App Store)

Unlocked with in-app purchasing. Price $1.99 (US iTunes App Store)

Unlocked with in-app purchasing. Price $1.99 (US iTunes App Store)

Unlocked with in-app purchasing. Price $1.99 (US iTunes App Store)

Unlocked with in-app purchasing. Price $1.99 (US iTunes App Store)

Unlocked with in-app purchasing. Price $1.99 (US iTunes App Store)

Unlocked with in-app purchasing. Price $1.99 (US iTunes App Store)

Unlocked with in-app purchasing. Price $1.99 (US iTunes App Store)

Unlocked with in-app purchasing. Price $1.99 (US iTunes App Store)

Unlocked with in-app purchasing. Price $1.99 (US iTunes App Store)

See also
Tap Sonic
DJMax Portable

References

External links
 DJMax Ray official page
 DJMax Ray on iTunes App Store
 DJMax Ray on Google Play Store

2012 video games
Android (operating system) games
DJMax games
IOS games
Video games developed in South Korea
Music video games